The 1952 South American Basketball Championship for Women was the 4th regional tournament for women in South America. It was held in Asunción, Paraguay and won by the local squad. Six teams competed.

Final rankings

Results

Each team played the other teams once, for a total of five games played by each team.

External links
FIBA Archive

South
International basketball competitions hosted by Paraguay
Sports competitions in Asunción
South American Basketball Championship for Women
South American Basketball Championship for Women
South American Basketball Championship for Women
1950s in Asunción